Nathan Robert Curtis (born 7 February 1996) is an English footballer who last played for Belper Town as a winger and striker.

Career
Curtis made his senior debut for Bradford City on 18 December 2012 in the FA Cup, appearing as a substitute; he replaced fellow debutant Forrayah Bass during extra time. He was not given a squad number for the 2013–14 season, and he was re-classed by the club as an "Apprentice" for the season. He was released by the club at the end of the 2013–14 season.

In July 2014 he signed for Ossett Town. He moved to Spennymoor Town in 2015, before signing for Harrogate Railway Athletic in February 2016. He then played for Frickley Athletic between August and October 2016, before finishing the 2016–17 season at former club Ossett Town.

He next played for Ossett Albion, moving on to Scarborough Athletic in September 2017, before signing for Goole in March 2018. He began the 2018–19 season at Belper Town. Belper Town announced the departure of Curtis in July 2022.

Career statistics

References

1996 births
Living people
English footballers
Bradford City A.F.C. players
Ossett Town F.C. players
Spennymoor Town F.C. players
Harrogate Railway Athletic F.C. players
Frickley Athletic F.C. players
Ossett Albion A.F.C. players
Scarborough Athletic F.C. players
Goole A.F.C. players
Belper Town F.C. players
Association football wingers
Association football forwards